Wendelinus is a name that can refer to:

 Wendelinus der Heilige (Wendelin of Trier; died 617), saint
 Godefridus Wendelinus (Godefroy Wendelin; 1580–1667), Flemish astronomer

See also
 
 Wendel (disambiguation)